2006 Avispa Fukuoka season

Competitions

Domestic results

J. League 1

Emperor's Cup

J. League Cup

Player statistics

Other pages
 J. League official site

Avispa Fukuoka
Avispa Fukuoka seasons